Players and pairs who neither have high enough rankings nor receive wild cards may participate in a qualifying tournament held one week before the annual Wimbledon Tennis Championships.

Seeds

  Mark Woodforde /  Amy Frazier (qualifying competition, lucky losers)
  Andrei Olhovskiy /  Eugenia Maniokova (first round)
  Mark Keil /  Lupita Novelo (qualifying competition)
  Nelson Aerts /  Patricia Miller (second round)
  Bruce Derlin /  Kristine Radford (second round)
  Nduka Odizor /  Maria Lindström (first round)

Qualifiers

  Sandon Stolle /  Noëlle van Lottum
  Andrew Kratzmann /  Kerry-Anne Guse
  Eric Amend /  Heather Ludloff

Lucky losers

  Mark Woodforde /  Amy Frazier
  Lan Bale /  Amy van Buuren
  Jamie Morgan /  Danielle Jones

Qualifying draw

First qualifier

Second qualifier

Third qualifier

External links
1991 Wimbledon Championships – Doubles draws and results at the International Tennis Federation

Mixed Doubles Qualifying
Wimbledon Championship by year – Qualifying